Margaret Todd may refer to:

Margaret Todd (golfer) (1918–2019), Canadian golfer
Margaret Todd (doctor) (1859–1918), Scottish writer and doctor, coined the term isotope
Margaret Joslin Todd (1883–1956), American film actress
Margaret Todd (schooner), a four-masted schooner